U.S. Route 19 (US 19) is a  U.S. Highway in the U.S. state of Georgia. It travels from the Florida state line south-southeast of Thomasville, Georgia, through Albany and Atlanta, to the North Carolina state line at a point north of Lake Nottely.

Route description

US 19 enters Georgia in a concurrency with  SR 3 and SR 300 as Lee Highway' south-southeast of Thomasville. Within the vicinity of Thomasville, it has a concurrency with US 84 where it has intersections with SR 122 and US 319 before US 84 finally branches off to the west. It continues north, traveling through Meigs where it intersects SR 3 Alt. and SR 111. Later, it runs through Albany, where it becomes a limited-access highway, has a brief concurrency with US 82, and the concurrency with SR 300 comes to an end. Between Taylor and Upson County, it has a concurrency with US 80 that ends south of Thomaston, and later runs through Zebulon where it runs in a one-way pair and intersects SR 18. It joins US 41 and proceeds north to Griffin. It then proceeds through the western tip of Henry County, traveling through Hampton, home of the Atlanta Motor Speedway. US 19 continues north through Clayton County where it is known as Tara Boulevard, before entering Atlanta.

Within Atlanta, US 19/US 41 runs along Northside Drive where it is joined by US 29/SR 3 Connector (Chapel Street Southwest). From there, US 9/US 29/US 41/SR 3 runs north and then curves northeast, passing by a group of condominiums called "The Villages of Castleberry Hill", before the road curves straight north between Nelson Street Southwest and Markham Street Southwest. Here the routes run along the west side of the Mercedes-Benz Stadium next door to the Georgia World Congress Center. US 29 leaves the concurrency with US 19/US 41 in the vicinity Georgia Tech, and turns northwest onto US 78/US 278/SR 8, which leaves US 9/US 41 to go west. The highway briefly curves northeast as it passes over some Norfolk Southern Railway lines, then turns north again at a partial interchange with Tech Parkway Northwest. Leaving the vicinity of Georgia Tech, it splits from US 41/SR 3 after traveling through downtown Atlanta and turns right onto on 14th Street, which is also the western beginning of  SR 9. One block after the interchange with I-75/I-85 (Downtown Connector) in Midtown, it has an intersection with a one-way pair with Spring Street (southbound US 9) before turning north on Peachtree Street The one-way pair ends at the vicinity of a complex interchange with SR 13 and the Savannah College of Art and Design Atlanta Campus, just south of a crossing over I-85, which includes the historic Peachtree (Amtrak station). After several miles, it intersects SR 141 in Buckhead, where Peachtree Street continues. It follows Roswell Road north through the city of Sandy Springs. At its southern interchange with I-285, it splits from SR 9, and overlaps I-285 between exits 25 and 27, the latter of which is for SR 400, which it overlaps north of there.

Most of this section is a limited-access road with four lanes in each direction, becoming two lanes in each direction as the highway continues away from the northern suburbs of Atlanta. From the north side of the state, the last major town it travels through is Blairsville.

Northwest from there, US 9/US 29/SR 11 passes the southwest border of the Butternut Creek Golf Course before entering Youngstown. The road turns north again where it utilizes a short causeway over Wellborn Branch, a tributary of the Nottely River before intersecting the northern terminus of Pat Haralson Memorial Drive. The road enters Canal Lake where another short causeway that makes a pond leading to Stevens Branch Creek. In Ivylog, the eastern terminus of SR 325 can be found across from Ivy Log Road. At the southwest corner of the North Carolina state line, SR 11 meets its northern terminus, while US 9 continues towards Erie, Pennsylvania and US 29 continues towards Knoxville, Tennessee.

The following portions of US 19 in Georgia is part of the National Highway System, a system of routes determined to be the most important for the nation's economy, mobility, and defense:
From the Florida state line to the I-75 interchange west of Morrow
From the SR 13 interchange in Atlanta to the North Carolina state line.

History

US 19 has been gradually four-laned since the 1950s. Initially, this was in the urban areas, but Georgia began four-laning the route through most of the rural sections of the state in the 1990s. The section from Griffin to Thomaston was four-laned by the early 1990s, while the section from Thomaston to Leesburg was completed in sections between 2000-2010.

In 2006, business and government officials in Southwest Georgia began a campaign to have I-185 extended to Monticello, Florida, and connect with I-10. The proposed route of the highway would have traveled parallel to SR 520 (known as "Corridor Z") to Albany, and then parallel to US 19. Local opposition to the plan soon emerged. Critics argued that the proposed interstate would siphon business from small towns that the new road bypassed. In 2009, Georgia's Department of Transportation concluded a two-year study of the proposal, which found that extending I-185 would "be inconsistent with existing comprehensive land use plans; would have a negative impact on prime agricultural land, forests and cultural assets; and could have a detrimental impact on poverty and minority populations". GDOT announced it would instead focus on upgrading and improving other key arterial highways in southwest Georgia, including SR 133 between Albany and Valdosta.

Major intersections

See also
 
 
 Special routes of U.S. Route 19

References

External links

 

 Georgia
19
Transportation in Thomas County, Georgia
Transportation in Mitchell County, Georgia
Transportation in Dougherty County, Georgia
Transportation in Lee County, Georgia
Transportation in Sumter County, Georgia
Transportation in Schley County, Georgia
Transportation in Upson County, Georgia
Transportation in Pike County, Georgia
Transportation in Spalding County, Georgia
Transportation in Clayton County, Georgia
Transportation in Fulton County, Georgia
Transportation in Forsyth County, Georgia
Transportation in Dawson County, Georgia
Transportation in Lumpkin County, Georgia
Transportation in Union County, Georgia
Roads in Atlanta